Tamara Maree Davis  is an Australian astrophysicist. , she is a professor in the School of Mathematics and Physics at the University of Queensland, where she has been employed since 2008.

The Australian Academy of Science awarded her their Nancy Millis Medal in 2015, 
and she was awarded an Australian Laureate Fellowship in 2018,.  
She received the Astronomical Society of Australia's Louise Webster Prize in 2009, and their Robert Ellery Lectureship in 2021. She became a Member of the Order of Australia in 2020.

As an athlete, Davis has competed for Australia at an international level in Ultimate Frisbee.

Education
Davis completed her Ph.D in astrophysics at the University of New South Wales in 2004. She also has a BSc in physics and a BA in philosophy.

References

External links
Tamara Davis on Twitter
Interview with Martine Harte about Ruby Payne-Scott for Engaging Women.

Living people
Australian astrophysicists
University of New South Wales alumni
Academic staff of the University of Queensland
Year of birth missing (living people)
Members of the Order of Australia
Australian women academics
21st-century Australian women scientists